Olubunmi Babatunde Rotimi Jr. (born July 16, 1995) is an American football defensive end for the Arlington Renegades. He played college football at Old Dominion and signed with the Chicago Bears as an undrafted free agent in 2018. Rotimi has also played for the Arizona Hotshots of the Alliance of American Football (AAF) and the New York Guardians of the XFL.

Early life and education
Bunmi Rotimi was born on July 16, 1995, in Alexandria, Virginia, to African immigrants. He attended West Potomac High School, earning all-district honors as a junior, even though his freshman year was the first year he tried playing the sport. Following high school he went to Old Dominion University, where he spent his true freshman year of 2013 as a redshirt. A walk-on, Rotimi played in twelve games as a freshman, starting two at defensive tackle. He recorded 30 tackles in the season.

As a sophomore, Rotimi played in twelve games, starting eleven and recording 36 tackles. He also was second on the team with 4.5 sacks. He transitioned to defensive end as a junior, starting thirteen games, and making 44 tackles and seven sacks. He started seven games as a senior, making 29 tackles and 5.5 sacks. Against Marshall, Rotimi made a blocked field goal. He was named all-Conference USA honorable mention following his senior season.

Professional career

Chicago Bears
After only competing at five NFL Combine drills, Rotimi went unselected in the 2018 NFL Draft. He was signed as an undrafted free agent by the Chicago Bears on May 11. He was released in July before the preseason started.

Arizona Hotshots
His next team after Chicago was the Arizona Hotshots of the Alliance of American Football (AAF). He appeared in five games, making six tackles and a sack before the league folded.

New York Guardians
After the Hotshots folded, Rotimi was signed by the New York Guardians of the XFL. He played in five games again, making 25 tackles before the league suspended.

Washington Football Team
Rotimi signed with the Washington Football Team on July 28, 2021. He was released during the team's final roster cuts but signed with their practice squad the following day. He was signed to the active roster on November 13, 2021. He made his first career sack in Week 15 against the Philadelphia Eagles.

On March 16, 2022, the team placed an exclusive-rights free agent tender on Rotimi. He was placed on injured reserve on August 22, 2022, and was released with an injury settlement a week later.

References

1995 births
Living people
Players of American football from Virginia
American football defensive ends
Old Dominion Monarchs football players
Washington Football Team players
African-American players of American football